The 2009 MLS Expansion Draft took place on November 25, 2009, and was a special draft for the Major League Soccer expansion team Philadelphia Union.

Format

Source

 Only 1 player may be selected from each team. Five of the league's 15 current teams will not have a player selected.
 Teams will be allowed to protect 11 players from their 28-man rosters. Generation Adidas players are automatically protected, though players who are graduated from the program to the senior roster at the end of the 2009 season are not.
 Teams with 4 or more international players must protect 3 of them. If a team has 3 or fewer international players, then it must protect all but one.
 Any developmental players selected must be moved up to the senior roster for the 2010 season.

Expansion Draft Results

Team-by-team breakdown

Source

Chicago Fire

Chivas USA

Colorado Rapids

Columbus Crew

DC United

FC Dallas

Houston Dynamo

Kansas City Wizards

Los Angeles Galaxy

New England Revolution

New York Red Bulls

Real Salt Lake

San Jose Earthquakes

Seattle Sounders FC

Toronto FC

References

Major League Soccer Expansion Draft
Mls Expansion Draft, 2009
MLS Expansion Draft